Arthur Russell Curtis (July 15, 1842 – April 8, 1925) was a volunteer officer in the Union Army during the American Civil War.

Early life and education
Arthur Russell Curtis was born July 15, 1842, at Boston, Massachusetts.

Civil War service
Curtis started the war as a private in the 4th Battalion of Massachusetts Militia. He transferred to the 20th Regiment Massachusetts Volunteer Infantry, was eventually promoted to lieutenant colonel and took command of the regiment. On December 3, 1867, President Andrew Johnson nominated Curtis for the honorary grade of brevet brigadier general, United States Volunteers, to rank from March 13, 1865, for gallant and meritorious services during the war, and the U.S. Senate confirmed the award on February 14, 1868.

Post-war life
Curtis was a clerk, postmaster and world traveler after the war. Arthur Russell Curtis died April 8, 1925, at Milwaukee, Wisconsin.

See also

List of Massachusetts generals in the American Civil War
Massachusetts in the American Civil War

Notes

References

Union Army generals
People of Massachusetts in the American Civil War
1842 births
1925 deaths
People from Boston